Milson may refer to:

Places
Milson, Shropshire
Milson, New Zealand
Milson Island, Australia
Milsons Point, Sydney, Australia

People
Milson (footballer, born 1977), Milson Ferreira dos Santos, Brazilian football striker
Felicio Milson (born 1999), Angolan footballer

Other
Milson, the dog in the British TV programme Friday Night Dinner